A Pyrrhic victory is a victory that inflicts such a devastating toll on the victor that it is tantamount to defeat. Such a victory negates any true sense of achievement or damages long-term progress. 

The phrase originates from a quote from Pyrrhus of Epirus, whose triumph against the Romans in the Battle of Asculum in 279 BC destroyed much of his forces, forcing the end of his campaign.

Etymology

A "Pyrrhic victory" is named after King Pyrrhus of Epirus, whose army suffered irreplaceable casualties in defeating the Romans at the Battle of Heraclea in 280 BC and the Battle of Asculum in 279 BC, during the Pyrrhic War. After the latter battle, Plutarch relates in a report by Dionysius:

In both Epirote victories, the Romans suffered greater casualties, but they had a much larger pool of replacements, so the casualties had less impact on the Roman war effort than the losses of King Pyrrhus.

The report is often quoted as:
{{quote|text=
If I achieve such a victory again, I shall return to Epirus without any soldier.|source=Orosius<ref>Historiarum Adversum Paganos Libri, IV, 1.15.</ref>}}
or

Examples
War

This list comprises examples of battles that ended in a Pyrrhic victory. It is not intended to be complete but to illustrate the concept.

 Battle of Asculum (279 BC), Pyrrhus of Epirus and Italian allies against the Roman Republic: the Romans, though suffering twice as many casualties, could easily replenish their ranks. Pyrrhus lost most of his commanders and a great part of the forces he had brought to Italy, and he withdrew to Sicily.
 Battle of Avarayr (451), Vardan Mamikonian and Christian Armenian rebels against the Sassanid Empire: the Persians were victorious but the battle proved to be a strategic victory for Armenians, as Avarayr paved the way to the Nvarsak Treaty (484 AD), which assured Armenian autonomy and religious freedom.
 Siege of Szigetvár (1566), Ottoman–Habsburg wars: although the Ottomans won the siege, it can be seen as a Pyrrhic victory because of the heavy Ottoman casualties, the death of Sultan Suleiman, and the resulting delay to the Ottoman push for Vienna that year which suspended Ottoman expansion in Europe.
 Siege of Ostend (1601–1604), Eighty Years' War: for three years the Spanish attempted to capture this port from Dutch and English defenders, even as the Dutch expanded their territory further east – including capturing the port of Sluis to replace Ostend before surrendering. The vast cost and casualties of the siege were compounded by Spain's subsequent campaign to recapture the Dutch gains, which achieved little, and by 1607 Spain was bankrupt. The resultant Twelve Years' Truce effectively made the Dutch Republic an independent state.
 Battle of Malplaquet (1709), War of the Spanish Succession: the battle was an Allied victory because Marlborough's army kept possession of the battlefield, but it had suffered double the French casualties and could not pursue. The French army withdrew in good order and relatively intact, and it remained a potent threat to further Allied operations.
 Battle of Gangwana (1741) fought between 1,000 strong Rathore cavalry of Jodhpur and combined armies of Mughal Empire, and Jaipur Numbering 100,000 with hundreds of cannons and artillery at Gangwana the Jaipur emerged victorious but with heavy losses of 12,000 and thousands other wounded
 Battle of Bunker Hill (1775), American Revolutionary War: after mounting three assaults on the colonial forces, the British won control of the Boston peninsula in the early stages of the war, but the engagement cost them many more casualties than the Americans had incurred (including a large number of officers) and led them to adopt more cautious methods, which helped American rebel forces; the political repercussions increased colonial support for independence.
 Battle of Guilford Court House (1781), American Revolutionary War: in this short battle, the outnumbered British force defeated an American army; the British lost a considerable number of men, and their drive to conquer the southern colonies changed course.
 Battle of Chancellorsville (1863), American Civil War: General Robert E. Lee split his army in the face of Hooker's larger Union force; the audacious strategy allowed the Confederate army to win the day against a numerically superior foe. However, 20% of Lee's army was injured or killed, including General Stonewall Jackson, and his losses were difficult to replace. Lee's weakened army went on the offensive, but less than two months later was defeated and forced to retreat after the Battle of Gettysburg.
 Battle of the Santa Cruz Islands (1942), World War II, Solomon Islands Campaign: Japanese and Allied naval forces met during the struggle for Guadalcanal and nearby islands. After an exchange of carrier air attacks, U.S. surface ships retreated with one carrier sunk and another severely damaged. The Japanese carrier forces achieved a tactical victory, as none of their ships were sunk, but the heavy loss of irreplaceable veteran aircrews was to the strategic advantage of the Allies. Japanese ground forces on Guadalcanal had also just lost the Battle for Henderson Field and were in no position to take advantage of the new situation.
 Battle of Chosin Reservoir (1950), Korean War: the Chinese army attempted to encircle and destroy the UN forces but in a 17-day battle in freezing weather, the UN forces inflicted crippling losses on the Chinese while making a fighting withdrawal. The Chinese occupied northeast Korea but they did not recover until the spring, and the UN maintained a foothold in Korea.
 Second Battle of Quảng Trị (1972), Vietnam War: The army of the Republic of Vietnam, with the support of ground artillery, ship gunboats, and bombers, attacked the ancient citadel of Quảng Trị. Although the citadel was recaptured after 81 days and nights, the ARVN army was weakened and after only 2 years, the Republic of Vietnam collapsed and the communists unified the North and South.
 Battle of Vukovar (1991), Croatian War of Independence: the Yugoslav People's Army (JNA) laid siege to the city of Vukovar, held by the Croatian National Guard and civilian volunteers. After 87 days, the ruined city fell to the JNA. Although the city was besieged from all sides, it exhausted the Yugoslav army and Serbian paramilitaries that had about twenty times more soldiers and complete armoured and artillery superiority, and they had twice as many losses. It was a turning point in the Croatian War of Independence.

Politics, sports and law

The term is used as an analogy in business, politics and sport to describe struggles that end up ruining the victor. Theologian Reinhold Niebuhr commented on the necessity of coercion in preserving the course of justice by warning,

In Beauharnais v. Illinois'', a 1952 U.S. Supreme Court decision involving a charge proscribing group libel, Associate Justice Black alluded to Pyrrhus in his dissent,

See also

 Attrition warfare
 Cadmean victory
 Cassandra (metaphor)
 John Henryism
 Last stand
 List of military disasters
 Moral victory
 Mutual assured destruction
 Parthian shot
 Pyrrhic defeat theory
 Strategic victory
 Suicide attack
 Sunk cost fallacy
 Tactical victory
 Winner's curse
 Zugzwang
 Carthaginian peace

References

Attrition warfare
Military terminology
Military strategy
Metaphors referring to war and violence
Victory
Pyrrhic War